Rhodri ap Hywel (died 964) was a King of Deheubarth in South Wales, and son of Hywel Dda.

On Hywel's death in 950 Deheubarth was shared between Rhodri and his two brothers, Edwin and Owain. The sons of Hywel were not able to keep hold of Gwynedd, which was reclaimed for the traditional dynasty of Aberffraw by Iago ap Idwal and Ieuaf ap Idwal, the sons of Idwal Foel.

In 952 Iago and Ieuaf invaded the south, penetrating as far as Dyfed. The sons of Hywel retaliated by invading the north in 966, reaching as far north as the Conwy valley before being defeated in a battle at Llanrwst and being obliged to retreat to Ceredigion.

References
John Davies (2007) A History of Wales (Penguin) 
John Edward Lloyd (1911) A history of Wales from the earliest times to the Edwardian conquest (Longmans, Green & Co.)

|-

Monarchs of Deheubarth
10th-century Welsh monarchs
953 deaths
House of Dinefwr
Year of birth unknown